The Municipal Journal (also known as The MJ) is a weekly print news magazine and online publication covering local government and civic administration in the United Kingdom. It was established in 1893, under the title London. It is now published by the Hemming Group, with a stated target audience of "council chief executives and their teams of decision-makers in local authorities and allied sectors". The editor since 2011 has been Heather Jameson; she replaced Michael Burton.

The academic historian John R. Griffiths has described its role in its first two decades of existence as:

elsewhere, Griffiths notes:

From 1950-1952, it was published as the Municipal Journal and Public Works Engineer.

As well as news and opinion pieces, the journal has also published articles by academic researchers.

The journal also sponsors and hosts an annual "MJ Achievement Awards".

References

External links 

 

Weekly magazines published in the United Kingdom
Local government in the United Kingdom
Magazines established in 1893
Professional and trade magazines
1893 establishments in the United Kingdom